Mevlan Murati (born 5 March 1994 in Tetovo) is a Macedonian professional footballer of Albanian origin who plays for Shkëndija and the Macedonia U-21 national team.

International career
In April 2014 he received his Albanian citizenship through his ethnicity, and later that month he was called up to the Albanian under-21 national team for a friendly tournament in May which took place in Italy. Eventually he decided to drop Albania U-21 and to play for Macedonia U-21 with whom he managed to win a historic qualification to the 2017 UEFA European Under-21 Championship in Poland.

References

1994 births
Living people
Sportspeople from Tetovo
Albanian footballers from North Macedonia
Association football fullbacks
Macedonian footballers
North Macedonia youth international footballers
North Macedonia under-21 international footballers
Albanian footballers
Albania under-21 international footballers
KF Shkëndija players
FK Partizani Tirana players
FK Shkupi players
Macedonian First Football League players
Kategoria Superiore players